Shantaram is an American drama thriller television series created by Eric Warren Singer and Steve Lightfoot, based on the novel of the same name by Gregory David Roberts. The story drew inspiration from Roberts' own life, which is about a bank robber from Australia who flees the country to India. The series will consist of twelve episodes directed by Bharat Nalluri, Iain B. MacDonald and Bronwen Hughes. Steve Lightfoot joined as showrunner after Eric Warren Singer departed the project. It is produced by Fair Honest Positive Creative, The 4 Keys, Bohemian Risk Productions, Square Head Productions, Anonymous Content and Paramount Television Studios and was distributed by Apple Inc. for their streaming service, Apple TV+. The series premiered on 14 October, 2022 and concluded on 16 December, 2022. In December 2022, the series was cancelled after one season.

Cast

Main

 Charlie Hunnam as Dale Conti/Lindsay "Linbaba" Ford, an Australian former paramedic-in-training who was arrested and subsequently imprisoned for a series of armed robberies until he eventually escaped from Pentridge Prison. He successfully flees to Bombay, India, changes his identity, and lives life as a wanted man. He also serves as the narrator of the series. The character of Lindsay is based on the life of Gregory David Roberts, the author of Shantaram.
 Fayssal Bazzi as Abdullah Taheri, an Iranian underboss who works for the crime lord Khader Khan.
 Sujaya Dasgupta as Kavita, a young journalist looking for a new story.
 Antonia Desplat as Karla Saaranen, a mysterious Swiss woman and Lin's love interest who is involved with the criminal underworld of Bombay.
 Elham Ehsas as Sebastian Modena, Lisa's Spanish pimp and love interest. 
 David Field as Wally Nightingale, a police detective in the Victoria Police who investigated Lin's crimes and hopes to track him down following his prison escape.
 Matthew Joseph as Ravi, a young boy living in the Sagar Wada slum who is orphaned following the death of his mother, Lakshmi.
 Rachel Kamath as Parvati, a young woman who runs a tea stall in the Sagar Wada slum who Prabhu is romantically interested in.
 Alyy Khan	as Qasim Ali, the respected headman of the Sagar Wada slum.
 Elektra Kilbey as Lisa Carter, Karla's American friend who is a prostitute suffering from substance abuse.
 Shiv Palekar as Vikram, a Bollywood stuntman who is obsessed with Spaghetti Westerns.
 Luke Pasqualino as Maurizio Belcane, Modena's Italian friend and a drug trafficker who dislikes Lin.
 Vincent Perez as Didier Levy, Karla's French friend who acts as a middleman for various criminals.
 Shubham Saraf as Prabaker "Prabhu" Kharre, a friendly tour guide who lives in the Sagar Wada slum and is the first person Lin meets after arriving in Bombay.
 Gabrielle Scharnitzky as Madame Zhou, the owner of "the Palace", a brothel that services wealthy clients.
 Alexander Siddig as Abdel Khader Khan, one of the biggest crime lords in Bombay who is fighting for control of the city's criminal underworld.

Recurring

 Rahel Romahn as Rafiq, a hardened criminal who ran books for the crime lord Walid Shah.
 Mel Odedra as Walid Shah, a crime lord in Bombay and the rival of Khader Khan.
 Arka Das as Nishant Patel 
 Sushant Davane as Ramesh
Suraj Kolarkar as Johnny Cigar

Episodes

Production

Origin 
When the novel Shantaram was published in 2003, several parties expressed interest in a film adaptation. As Warner Bros. purchased the film's rights for $2 million, Brad Grey, an executive of the company, decided to hire Johnny Depp due to his expression of love for the book, which was to be based on a script written by the book's author Gregory David Roberts. In October 2005, Warner Bros. hired screenwriter Eric Roth to rewrite the initial draft created by Roberts. The following November, the studio hired Peter Weir to direct and to develop the script with Roth.

Originally planned to schedule production for late 2006, in June of that year, Weir departed from the project with a studio spokesperson citing different interpretations between the director, the studio, and producers, and was replaced by Mira Nair in January 2007. The studio initially wanted to start production in early 2007, which was later cancelled by Warner Bros, citing the 2007–2008 Writers Guild of America strike's interference with the script's readiness, the schedule, and climatic conflicts with the difficulties in filming between India and New Mexico in the United States.

Although in November 2008, The Independent reported the project had been cancelled, a report in May 2013, from the Mumbai Mirror stated that Warner Bros. had negotiated to retain the film rights until 2015, speculating that a film adaptation of Shantaram was still in the works. The following October, Depp approached Joel Edgerton to star in his place also being involved in the project as a producer. Warner Bros. was in early talks with Garth Davis, co-director of the Emmy-nominated Top of the Lake, to make his feature film directing debut on the movie which also failed to happen.

Development 
In January 2018, Anonymous Content and Paramount Television Studios acquired the rights to Shantaram, with plans to repurpose it as a television series. In June 2018, it was announced that Apple Inc. was developing a television adaptation of the novel for Apple TV+, becoming one of their first international production with two other series announced during its launch. Eric Warren Singer was appointed as the screenwriter, who was to also serve as the executive producer alongside David Manson, Nicole Clemens, Steve Golin, and Andrea Barron with Charlie Hunnam in the lead role. Singer took more than year to complete the writing of the series. Pre-production work was completed by August 2019. In September 2019, Charlie Hunnam, Richard Roxburgh and Radhika Apte were cast as series leads, with Justin Kurzel set to direct the first two and last two episodes of the ten-part series.

Shantaram was set to begin in Victoria, Australia, and Bhopal, India, as the primary locations. The Australian Government planned to provide $5 million for the production of the project through its Location Incentive program, with the Victorian Government also supporting the series through Film Victoria's Production Incentive Attraction Fund. The budget was estimated at $100 million.

In February 2020, Singer stepped down as showrunner of the series, stating that the delay in shooting had created potential scheduling conflicts. In November 2020, Apple hired Steve Lightfoot as the new showrunner for the series, who completed writing the remaining episodes; Alexander Siddig joined the cast in March 2021. Siddig was approached to play the role of Kader Khan, a role rumoured to have been meant for Amitabh Bachchan, who Mira Nair had proposed. Bharat Nalluri was announced as director of the remaining six episodes.

Filming 
Filming of the series began in October 2019 in Australia, followed by a move to India in November 2019, with a significant portion of the series expected to be shot over the course of a year in Bhopal and various other locations in Madhya Pradesh. Shooting of the series was suspended in February 2020 due to the Indian monsoon season which happens in the June–October period, adding to the reasons were Singer's departure from the series leading to a writing backlog, as well as the COVID-19 pandemic restrictions. Production restarted in Melbourne, Australia, in May 2021 before additional filming was moved to Thailand due to India's worsening COVID-19 outbreaks. Production returned to Melbourne in August 2021. All principal photography was completed in mid-December 2021.

Reception 
The review aggregator website Rotten Tomatoes reported a 56% approval rating with an average rating of 5.9/10, based on 27 critic reviews. The website's critics consensus reads, "Charlie Hunnam is appealingly roguish as the irascible Lin Ford, but Shantarams lack of a propelling narrative leaves this compelling character stranded." Metacritic, which uses a weighted average, assigned a score of 62 out of 100 based on 14 critics, indicating "generally favorable reviews".

References

External links

Apple TV+ original programming
English-language television shows
2020s American drama television series
2022 American television series debuts
2022 American television series endings
American thriller television series
Television shows based on Australian novels
Television productions suspended due to the COVID-19 pandemic
Television shows set in India
Television shows filmed in Australia
Television shows filmed in Thailand
Television series by Anonymous Content
Television series by Paramount Television